Wheaton station could refer to:

 Wheaton station (Union Pacific), in Wheaton, Illinois
 Wheaton station (Chicago Aurora and Elgin Railroad), defunct, in Wheaton, Illinois
 Wheaton station (Washington Metro), in Wheaton, Maryland